Charlie Nash may refer to:

 Charlie Nash (boxer), retired Irish boxer, b. 1951
 Charlie Nash (Street Fighter), a fictional character in the Street Fighter video game series

See also
 Charles Nash (disambiguation)